The Apache Kid's Escape  is a 1930 American Western film written, produced and directed by Robert J. Horner and starring Jack Perrin and his wife Josephine Hill. It was a remake of The White Outlaw (1929). The film was shot in Valencia, California. Jack Perrin's five-picture deal with Horner ended up in court when Perrin only received $1,425 out of the $2,900 that was agreed upon.

Plot
Hurt by his sister's letter saying they can not accept the money he sent for his sick mother as it was obtained illegally, the Apache Kid decides to go on the straight and narrow. Others including Buck Harris and Ted Conway decide to use the Apache Kid's trademark of a chequered scarf to commit robberies.

Cast
 Jack Perrin as Jim AKA The Apache Kid
 Fred Church as Ted Conway
 Josephine Hill as Jane Wilson
 Virginia Ashcroft as Sally Wilson
 Bud Osborne as Buck Harris
 Fred Burns as Bill Lang
 Henry Roquemore as	Frank Conway 
 Charles Le Moyne as Another Sheriff
 Buzz Barton as Tim Wells
 Horace B. Carpenter as Larry Wilson 
 Starlight the Horse as himself

References

Bibliography
 John Brooker The Happiest Trails Lulu.com; First Edition (April 7, 2017)

External links
 

1930 films
1930 Western (genre) films
American Western (genre) films
Remakes of American films
1930s English-language films
Films directed by Robert J. Horner
1930s American films